Alfred Meissner (15 October 1821, Teplitz – 29 May 1885, Bregenz) was an Austrian poet.

Biography
He is a grandson of the voluminous miscellaneous author August Gottlieb Meissner (1753-1807). He studied medicine, taking his degree at Prague in 1846. To elude the Austrian censorship, he published in the same year at Leipzig his epic poem Ziska (10th ed., 1867). He long resided chiefly in Paris, and returned to Prague in 1850, where he and Moritz Hartmann were the principal representatives of the liberal school of German poetry in Bohemia, a 10th edition of his Gedichte appearing in 1867.

Works
Some of his works, especially Der Sohn des Atta Troll (1850), abound with the peculiar sarcasm and pathos in which Heinrich Heine excelled, and he published Erinnerungen an Heine (1854).<ref>Meisser also published Heinrich Heine. Errinerungen von Alfred Meisser. Hamburg: Hoffman und Campe, 1856 and "The Last Years of Heinrich Heine", Putnam's Monthly, November 1856, pp. 517-526</ref> Among his novels are Zwischen Fürst und Volk (Between prince and people, 3 vols., 2d ed., 1861), illustrating the revolutions of 1848; Zur Ehre Gottes (To the honor of God, 2 vols., 1861); and Schwarzgelb (8 vols., Berlin, 1864; popular edition, 1 vol., 1866). His other writings include Charaktermasken (3 vols., Leipzig, 1861–63); Novellen (2 vols., Leipzig, 1864); Die Kinder Rom's (Children of Rome, 4 vols., Berlin, 1870); and Rococo-Bilder'' (Gumbinnen, 1871).

Notes

References

External links
 

1822 births
1885 deaths
People from the Kingdom of Bohemia
19th-century Austrian poets
Austrian male poets
Austrian medical writers
People from Teplice
19th-century male writers
 Austrian expatriates in France